Antasia is a monotypic moth genus in the family Geometridae described by Warren in 1894. Its only species, Antasia flavicapitata, was first described by Achille Guenée in 1857. It is found in Australia.

References

Oenochrominae
Geometridae genera
Monotypic moth genera